Jason Pottinger (born June 29, 1983) is a former professional Canadian football linebacker who played in the Canadian Football League (CFL). He was drafted second overall by the BC Lions in the 2006 CFL Draft. He played CIS football for the McMaster Marauders.

Early years
Pottinger went to McMaster University in Hamilton, Ontario and played CIS football for the McMaster Marauders from 2002 to 2005. He was named a member of the Ontario University Athletics All-Star Team in each of his last three seasons and a member of the All-Canadian team twice. He was named the Outstanding Defensive Player of the OUA in for both the 2004 and 2005 seasons.

Jason played football with the Oshawa Hawkeyes from age 9 until he began playing for McMaster University.  He continues to stay in touch with Durham Region youth football programs, and is a big supporter of youth football everywhere.

Professional career
Pottinger was drafted in the first round, second overall in the 2006 CFL Draft by the BC Lions. In his first season, the 2006 BC Lions season, he recorded no sacks, 6 tackles and 19 special teams tackles in all 18 games for the Lions and was part of the Lions 94th Grey Cup victory. In his three seasons with the Lions, Pottinger recorded 115 combined tackles and one sack over 54 games.

On March 23, 2009, it was announced that Pottinger was traded to the Toronto Argonauts in exchange for a first round pick in the upcoming 2009 CFL Draft.

The Toronto Argonauts re-signed Pottinger to a new 2-year deal on February 15, 2012, that will see him through to the 2013 season. He won his second Grey Cup championship with the Argonauts after their 100th Grey Cup victory.

On December 16, 2013, Pottinger was drafted by the Ottawa Redblacks in the 2013 CFL Expansion Draft. He announced his retirement on May 29, 2015.

Personal life
In 2014, Pottinger completed his M.B.A. at the Schulich School of Business. Pottinger resides in the GTA with his wife Elizabeth and daughter Quinn.

References

External links
Ottawa Redblacks bio

1983 births
Living people
Sportspeople from Whitby, Ontario
Canadian football linebackers
McMaster Marauders football players
Toronto Argonauts players
Players of Canadian football from Ontario
BC Lions players
Ottawa Redblacks players